Hercules Henry Dickinson (b & d Dublin, 14 September 1827 – 17 May 1905) was an Irish priest and theologian.

Dickinson was born in Dublin and educated at Trinity College, Dublin. He was ordained deacon in 1851 and priest a year later. He was curate of St St Ann, Dublin until 1855 and vicar from then until 1902. In 1865 he became sub-dean of the Chapel Royal, Dublin, and in 1868 it's dean. He was also chaplain to the lord lieutenant. Dickinson as treasurer of St Patrick's Cathedral, Dublin from 1869 to 1876 and precentor  from 1876 to 1902. In 1894 he became professor of pastoral theology at TCD. He retired in 1902. He is buried at Mount Jerome cemetery.

References

1827 births
1905 deaths
Alumni of Trinity College Dublin
Academics of Trinity College Dublin
Irish Anglicans
Deans of the Chapel Royal, Dublin